24K Magic may refer to:
24K Magic (album), a 2016 album by Bruno Mars
"24K Magic" (song), the album's title track
24K Magic World Tour, a concert tour